Inanidrilus aduncosetis is a species of annelid worm. It is known from subtidal coarse coral sands in Bermuda, in the Atlantic Ocean.

References

aduncosetis
Endemic fauna of Bermuda
Fauna of the Atlantic Ocean
Taxa named by Christer Erséus
Animals described in 1984